Usteria Dennst. is a synonym of the Euphorbiaceae genus Acalypha. Usteria Medik. is a synonym of the Hyacinthaceae genus Hyacinthoides.

Usteria is a plant genus in the family Loganiaceae. It was established in 1790 by Carl Ludwig Willdenow.

Species
 Usteria guineensis

References

Loganiaceae
Gentianales genera